Cuneiform Records is a record label in Silver Spring, Maryland.

Founded in 1984, the label releases an mixture of musical styles, all with a Rock in Opposition aesthetic, including progressive jazz, jazz fusion, the Canterbury scene, and electronic music. Cuneiform has introduced many notable acts but also documents older bands who fit the profile, including its release of the Heldon catalog and several archival Soft Machine recordings. The label operates with a mail-order retailer, Wayside Music.

In 2018, founder Steve Feigenbaum announced that the label would not release any new music that year. Nevertheless, 2019 saw the arrival of several new albums on the Cuneiform label.

Discography

References

External links
 Official site

American independent record labels
Jazz record labels
Reissue record labels
Progressive rock record labels
Electronic music record labels